The 1854 Treaty Authority is an intertribal, co-management agency committed to the implementation of off-reservation treaty rights on behalf of its two-member Ojibwa tribes.

Based out of Duluth, Minnesota, 1854 Treaty Authority's policy is set by the Board of Commissioners composed of the tribal chairperson from each member tribe or a designee.  1854 Treaty Authority has three divisions including Administration, Conservation Enforcement and Resource Management.

History
In 1985, The Grand Portage Band of Lake Superior Chippewa filed suit in U.S. District Court seeking a declaratory judgment that the 1854 Treaty of La Pointe reserved the Band's right to hunt and fish in the 1854 Treaty-Ceded Territory free of state regulation. The other Bands that signed the treaty and resided in the territory (Fond du Lac, Bois Forte) subsequently joined the lawsuit. By 1988, an out of court agreement was negotiated and ultimately ratified by the Minnesota State Legislature:
 crux of the agreement was the band would exercise limited treaty rights in exchange for a yearly monetary payment.
 the agreement outlines what band members can and can't do off-reservation. Basic crux is no commercialization (spearing, netting, etc.)

In 1988, the Tri-Band Authority was established to implement the agreement and was governed by a Board of Directors, which consisted of the duly elected officials of each of the Grand Portage, Bois Forte, and the Fond du Lac Bands. However, in 1989, Fond du Lac (who is now a party to the Great Lakes Indian Fish & Wildlife Commission) withdrew from the agreement. The Tri-Band Authority then became the 1854 Authority and subsequently changed their name in 2006 to the 1854 Treaty Authority and continued to implement the agreement for the Grand Portage and Bois Forte Bands.

Coverage areas
 Grand Portage Fishing Zone of Minnesota's portion of the 1842 Treaty of La Pointe-ceded Territory
 1854 Treaty of La Pointe-ceded Territory—Co-managed with the Great Lakes Indian Fish & Wildlife Commission
 1866 Treaty of Washington (Bois Forte band of Chippewa Indians)-ceded territory—No hunting, fishing or gathering, but cultural resources are reviewed and enforced.

Member tribes
 Bois Forte Band of Chippewa
 Fond du Lac Band of Lake Superior Chippewa (former member)
 Grand Portage Band of Chippewa

External links
 The 1854 Treaty Authority's website

Ojibwe
Anishinaabe tribal treaty administrants
Organizations based in Minnesota
Native American history of Minnesota
1854 establishments in the United States